

Qualification system
A total of 125 weightlifters (69 male and 56 women) will qualify to compete at the games. Qualification was done at the 2013 and 2014 Pan American Championships, where nations had points assigned per athlete's finishing position. The totals of both Championships were added and quotas were then awarded to the top 20 men's teams and 18 women's teams. A further two wildcards (one for each gender) was awarded.

Qualification timeline

Qualification summary

Men
The following is the list of nations winning quotas for men's events: Aruba and Barbados was later awarded a wildcard spot. Aruba declined this quota, and the spot was reallocated to Bolivia. 
 Host nation: 7 Athletes
 Teams 1st–3rd: 7 Athletes
 Teams 4th–6th: 5 Athletes
 Teams 7th–8th: 4 Athletes
 Teams 9th–12th: 2 Athletes
 Teams 13th–20th: 1 Athlete

Women
The following is the list of nations winning quotas for women's events: Haiti was later awarded a wildcard spot. 
 Host nation: 6 Athletes
 Teams 1st–3rd: 6 Athletes
 Teams 4th–6th: 4 Athletes
 Teams 7th–8th: 3 Athletes
 Teams 9th–11th: 2 Athletes
 Teams 12th–18th: 1 Athlete

References

External links
Men's overall standings and quotas
Women's overall standings and quotas

2013 in weightlifting
2014 in weightlifting
Qualification for the 2015 Pan American Games
Weightlifting at the 2015 Pan American Games